Since 1901, Silliman University has produced thousands of graduates from early childhood (pre-elementary) up to the undergraduate and graduate levels. This is a list of notable people affiliated with the university, including current and former faculty members, alumni and people who have been conferred honorary degrees.  People affiliated with Silliman University are called Sillimanians.

Alumni

Professors

Presidents of Silliman

http://gwhs-stg01.i.gov.ph/~s1govncmbph/about-us/directory-of-officials/==References==

Silliman University